Jason Charles Lewis known professionally as Jayce Lewis (born 29 September 1984) is a Welsh musician from Bridgend, South Wales. In 2009 his self-produced single titled "Icon" (also included on EMI Records' Smash Hits 2009 compilation) achieved a top-10 chart position alongside VH1/MTV Asia Viacom18 features.  With strong industrial music and synthpop influences, his music has been described as alternative rock with electronica roots and "tribal percussion". Lewis has collaborated with acts such as Queen Rammstein and synthpop icon Gary Numan, for whom Lewis has been a supporting act three times.

Early years and influences
Growing up in Bridgend - Wales, Lewis began by learning to play guitar at the age of six. He was influenced by Brian May of Queen and Igor Cavalera of Sepultura.

Lewis is a keen follower of dance and tribal music and incorporates this into his solo work.

Career

Previously employed as a fabricator and welder, Lewis forged a professional music career following the release of his self-produced 2009 single "Icon", a hit in Asia and later well-received in Europe. He signed a five-year deal to EMI Records Europe and Asia on 4 September 2009, and counts cymbal manufacturer Paiste among his professional sponsors.

With his long-time friend and promoter David Prowse (the actor who portrayed Darth Vader in the original Star Wars trilogy) as manager, Lewis formed a live touring band with a group of friends, and designed and manufactured his own live set production.

"Icon", 2009
His self-produced solo single "Icon" was released in summer 2009, on EMI Records. It was heavily featured on VH1 and MTV Asia, resulting in him being artist of the month and becoming the headlining act of VH1 India Global Express Tour, covering four cities across India. "Icon" had a European release in 2010 and was also featured on Kerrang TV together with high rotations features on Scuzz's includeding a two-hour take over.

The album's lyrics touch on several subject matters inspired by Lewis's life experiences.

In 2009 Lewis found success following air-time in Asian territories and his broader concert touring, including Europe and North America. In February 2010, he headlined the Rock 'N India festival, which hosted events in New Delhi and Bangalore, alongside popular artists such as the Backstreet Boys and Richard Marx. Lewis was presented a DNA Artist of the Festival award plaque by the event's founder, Venkat Vardhan.

BBC 1 documentary
A BBC documentary covering Lewis's journey to fame was shown on BBC One Wales on 10 March 2010 as part of a series called Planet Wales. The 40-minute documentary, titled "Big in India" was the first of the series and included live performances in Dubai, India, and Germany. The documentary was repeated three months later on BBC One Wales and North. The documentary covered Lewis and EMI working towards the release of his second single and album. A DVD released was planned and a few promo copies produced, but never came to fruition.

Début album, 2010
After writing and recording since early 2009, with a working title of "Chapter", Lewis released his first album as the self-titled Jayce Lewis, on 11 October 2010. Although he only released two singles in 2010, Lewis's album reached number 7 in the M-Music Asian charts, higher than those of Eminem and Bon Jovi, but was kept from the number 6 spot by Linkin Park. It's claimed; the wide diversity in the album attracted the broad interest in media and public.

The album was recorded in three separate studios, one of which is the famous Nott-in-Pill Studios in Newport, with ex-Skindred duo Jeff and Ginge. The album's release was promoted by a succession of videos and singles and accompanying videos: "Icon", "Solitaire", "Passes II", and "Electric Medicine". The videos were directed and edited by Lewis with chosen production teams.  He noted the "Electric Medicine" video as his proudest achievement to date, both on and off the screen.

Hot 50 Sexiest men in Wales
In June 2010 the Welshman made the list in a public vote of Wales's top 50 sexiest men. Lewis was ranked at number 49.

Gary Numan collaborations, 2011 onward

In September and December 2011, Gary Numan confirmed Jayce as main support on his Dead Son Rising UK tour, covering 12 shows across the country. In an online interview, Numan hailed Lewis to being one of the best supporting acts to ever tour with him.

Numan documented the DSR tour in a published diary, praising Jayce further.  Numan publicly invited Lewis to tour America together in 2012. Later, in 2014, both Numan collaborated with Lewis on "Redesign", which featured on Lewis's Nemesis album (under the project name Protafield).

Both Numan and Lewis toured once again later in 2017, confirming Lewis as main support for Gary Numan's UK and European leg of the Savage (Songs from a Broken World) tour promoting his 18th studio solo album. To date, Jayce Lewis is the only live act to have ever tour with Gary Numan twice.

Protafield Nemesis, 2014

Appearing in an interview on Sky TV's The Moore Show, Lewis discussed working on second album, although not naming the title; he described as "a huge step forwards" from the first release.
Early in 2014 Lewis announced his new project, Protafield, after agreeing a record contract with Caroline International (Universal Music Group) with his new album 'Nemesis'. It's reported that the Protafield name was created between Lewis and Fear Factory front man Burton C. Bell

Guest appearances
The Nemesis album had guest-performer involvement, including Roger Taylor of Queen (providing the drum track for "Wrath"), Gary Numan (guest vocals on "Redesign"), and actor Lance Henriksen (best known for Aliens and two follow-on films, and the TV series Millennium).

Million (Part 1) 2017
In 2017, Lewis released his third studio album, titled Million. Unlike previous releases, Million was released in a series of two parts, both on the label Universal.  In total, the album consisted of seven tracks, and featured a collaboration with Queen guitarist Brian May.

Million (Part 2) 2018
On October 12, 2018, Million (Part 2) was announced for release. The second part of the double album concept featured another special guest, the celebrated atheist Professor Richard Dawkins, who recorded a spoken word contribution for the track 'Exhale'.

Steve Strange (Visage)
Steve Strange's admiration for Jayce was commonly known following the "Big in India" BBC documentary. Strange, of the 1980s new romantic band Visage, promoted their collaboration with the release of a live recording of them performing the 1980s hit "Fade to Grey" together. Strange later recorded his final ever recordings with Lewis shortly before his death on 12 February 2015 at his studio in Bridgend, South Wales.

Lewis dealt with Strange's funeral arrangements and was a pallbearer, alongside other 1980s stars such as Boy George, Martin Kemp, Gary Kemp and Steve Norman. For a short time Lewis was also the live drummer in Visage on their 'Hearts and Knives' tour in 2013, the Welshman's been quoted in describing pallbearer duties for Strange as 'The most overwhelming experience of his life'.

David Prowse

David Prowse was an active manager of Jayce from 2005 to 2010. In 2009, Prowse agreed to handle all PR for Lewis following a long term friendship since 2001.

On 1 October 2015, the two filmed a mini-documentary, The Force's Mouth, a short studio tutorial video demonstrating a recording process with Prowse and effecting his voice as the famous villain Darth Vader, a welcomed piece of film by the Star Wars community after 37 years of debate about the voice casting choices of the original production.  Prowse and Lewis retained a close friendship and business partnership lasting over 19 years.

Northstone Studios

In October 2016 Lewis announced the opening of his newly built recording studio, Northstone Studios. The studio was renovated from a disused outbuilding connected to the Court Colman Manor in Bridgend, South Wales. It took Lewis a total of nine months to build at a cost of £60,000 with an undisclosed investment from local government; Creative Industry Wales. In several interviews Lewis mentions the workings of his new album along with a collaboration with Queen guitarist; Brian May.

Ascension of The Watchers
In 2020 Lewis become a member of the American gothic rock band Ascension of The Watchers, formed by Fear Factory front man Burton C. Bell and Ministry band keyboardist John Bechdel. Lewis was initially involved as producer and mixer for their 2020 album Apocrypha, but his full-time role as drummer and programmer became clear during the album's creative process.

Rammstein

2022 German Industrial act Rammstein released a remix composition collaboration with Jayce Lewis of the song 'Armee Der Tristen' following a conversation with the bands percussionist Christoph Schneider whom, Lewis has been a friend of for 12 years. In an interview with Rammwiki.net Jayce discussed approaching the drummer soon after hearing their new Rammstein album, titled 'Zeit' insisting on a remix composition as he had Immediate Ideas and Vision to compose a new edition. Till Lindemann vocal recordings are the only original feature recordings from the official song release.

Discography
Studio albums

References

1984 births
Living people
Welsh rock drummers
Welsh rock guitarists
Welsh rock singers
Welsh keyboardists
British synth-pop musicians
British industrial musicians